John Geddes (c. 1925 – August 28, 2017) was a Canadian curler. He played as third on the 1958 Brier-winning Team Alberta, skipped by Matt Baldwin. He was from Edmonton and was a dentist and graduated from the University of Alberta. Geddes died in 2017, aged 92.

References

1920s births
2017 deaths
Brier champions
Canadian dentists
Canadian male curlers
Curlers from Edmonton
Curlers from Saskatchewan
University of Alberta alumni
20th-century dentists